Wörsbach is a river of Hesse, Germany. It passes through Idstein, and flows into the Emsbach near Niederbrechen.

See also
List of rivers of Hesse

References

Rivers of Hesse
Rivers of the Taunus
Rivers of Germany